Kévin das Neves (born 8 May 1986) is a French football defender who plays for Championnat National side Châteauroux. Generally playing as a right back, he has been capped once for the France under-21 squad. Das Neves is of Portuguese descent through his mother's side.

Career statistics
.

References

External links
 
 

Living people
1986 births
Sportspeople from Clermont-Ferrand
Association football defenders
French footballers
France youth international footballers
French people of Portuguese descent
FC Nantes players
US Boulogne players
Vendée Poiré-sur-Vie Football players
LB Châteauroux players
Ligue 1 players
Ligue 2 players
Championnat National players
Footballers from Auvergne-Rhône-Alpes